The 1995 Aragonese regional election was held on Sunday, 28 May 1995, to elect the 4th Cortes of the autonomous community of Aragon. All 67 seats in the Cortes were up for election. The election was held simultaneously with regional elections in 12 other autonomous communities and local elections all throughout Spain.

The election saw a marked increase for the People's Party (PP), which went on to win the election doubling its 1991 vote and gaining ten seats. Much of the increase came at the expense of the Spanish Socialist Workers' Party (PSOE), at the moment beset by corruption scandals. The Aragonese Party (PAR) lost ground for the second consecutive election and was displaced to 3rd place. United Left (IU) improved its position while the left-wing regionalist Aragonese Union (CHA) won seats in the Cortes for the first time.

The new legislature elected Santiago Lanzuela as the first PP President of Aragon by 41 votes to 26. The PP and PAR deputies backed Lanzuela while PSOE, CHA and IU voted against. Lanzuela headed a PP administration with the initial support of the PAR.

Overview

Electoral system
The Cortes of Aragon were the devolved, unicameral legislature of the autonomous community of Aragon, having legislative power in regional matters as defined by the Spanish Constitution and the Aragonese Statute of Autonomy, as well as the ability to vote confidence in or withdraw it from a regional president.

Voting for the Cortes was on the basis of universal suffrage, which comprised all nationals over 18 years of age, registered in Aragon and in full enjoyment of their political rights. The 67 members of the Cortes of Aragon were elected using the D'Hondt method and a closed list proportional representation, with an electoral threshold of three percent of valid votes—which included blank ballots—being applied in each constituency. Seats were allocated to constituencies, corresponding to the provinces of Huesca, Teruel and Zaragoza, with each being allocated an initial minimum of 13 seats and the remaining 28 being distributed in proportion to their populations (provided that the seat-to-population ratio in the most populated province did not exceed 2.75 times that of the least populated one).

The use of the D'Hondt method might result in a higher effective threshold, depending on the district magnitude.

Election date
The term of the Cortes of Aragon expired four years after the date of their previous election. Elections to the Cortes were fixed for the fourth Sunday of May every four years. The previous election was held on 26 May 1991, setting the election date for the Cortes on Sunday, 28 May 1995.

The Cortes of Aragon could not be dissolved before the date of expiry of parliament except in the event of an investiture process failing to elect a regional president within a two-month period from the first ballot. In such a case, the Cortes were to be automatically dissolved and a snap election called, with elected deputies merely serving out what remained of their four-year terms.

Background
The previous legislature had been tightly divided between the left and right blocs, with an independent, former PP deputy holding the balance of power. This had resulted in a coalition between the PP and PAR being replaced by a PSOE administration in 1993. However, legal difficulties had forced the resignation of the PSOE Aragonese president José Marco in January 1995, being replaced by party colleague Ramón Tejedor. The PSOE Federal Executive designated Marcelino Iglesias as candidate for president in the 1995 election, marginalizing Marco from the election of the regional candidate.

Parties and candidates
The electoral law allowed for parties and federations registered in the interior ministry, coalitions and groupings of electors to present lists of candidates. Parties and federations intending to form a coalition ahead of an election were required to inform the relevant Electoral Commission within ten days of the election call, whereas groupings of electors needed to secure the signature of at least one percent of the electorate in the constituencies for which they sought election, disallowing electors from signing for more than one list of candidates.

Below is a list of the main parties and electoral alliances which contested the election:

Opinion polls
The table below lists voting intention estimates in reverse chronological order, showing the most recent first and using the dates when the survey fieldwork was done, as opposed to the date of publication. Where the fieldwork dates are unknown, the date of publication is given instead. The highest percentage figure in each polling survey is displayed with its background shaded in the leading party's colour. If a tie ensues, this is applied to the figures with the highest percentages. The "Lead" column on the right shows the percentage-point difference between the parties with the highest percentages in a poll. When available, seat projections determined by the polling organisations are displayed below (or in place of) the percentages in a smaller font; 34 seats were required for an absolute majority in the Cortes of Aragon.

Results

Overall

Distribution by constituency

Aftermath

References
Opinion poll sources

Other

1995 in Aragon
Aragon
Regional elections in Aragon
May 1995 events in Europe